Moransengo is a comune (municipality) in the Province of Asti in the Italian region Piedmont, located about  east of Turin and about  northwest of Asti.

Moransengo borders the following municipalities: Brozolo, Brusasco, Cavagnolo, Cocconato, and Tonengo.

References

Cities and towns in Piedmont